The Embassy of Sweden in Mexico City is Sweden's diplomatic mission in Mexico.

History
Sweden and Mexico have had diplomatic relations since 1850. In 1913 a position as chargé d'affaires was established in Mexico. In the 1940s, Costa Rica, Guatemala, Honduras, Nicaragua, Panama and El Salvador belonged to the embassy's area of operation. The diplomatic mission consisted during this time of a emissary and a first clerk. In 1956, an ambassador was accredited in Mexico.

Tasks
The embassy have three main priorities: Promotion of Sweden, monitoring the political and economic situation in Mexico and consular affairs. The promotion of Sweden includes activities that improves the knowledge and strengthen the image of Sweden as a progressive country characterized by innovative thinking, consideration and respect towards others, openness and authenticity. To achieve this, the embassy cooperates with over 100 Swedish companies located in Mexico to stimulate trade relations between the two countries. In addition, the embassy works to promote Swedish culture in Mexico. The embassy informs the Swedish government about the political and economic situation in the Mexico, a task that requires a large network of contacts in the Mexican society. The third priority concerns consular services and migration issues. This area includes administrative work on migration cases, passports, visas, residence permits and other assistance to Swedish or Mexican citizens.

Buildings

Chancery
In the 1920s, the embassy was located on Calle Apartado 86 in the Historic center of Mexico City and then on Calle Liverpool 5 in the Cuauhtémoc borough. By the 1930s, the address was now Calle Londres 136 A in Cuauhtémoc. By the 1940s, the embassy had moved once again, this time to Calle Liverpool 57 in Cuauhtémoc. By the 1960s, the embassy was located at Buenavista 3, México 3. In the early 1970s, the embassy moved to Avenida Homero 136-9 in Polanco.

The chancery is since 1994 located at Paseo de las Palmas 1375 in the Lomas de Chapultepec area. The building consists of four floors and has a white-plastered facade. It was built in 1946 and the first owners were Aida and David Egea de Naval. They bought the plot from Nueva Chapultepec Heights Company. In 1989, the couple sold the house and in 1994 it was again for sale. This time, Britt Ericsson de Oliva, second secretary of the Swedish Embassy, bought the building on behalf of the Swedish state. The house then underwent extensive renovation and refurbishment. It had until 1994 served as a family residence. Architect for the remodeling was Thord Hallström, BSK Arkitekter.

In 2018, Sweco was commissioned by the National Property Board of Sweden to construct the new Swedish Embassy in Mexico City. The new chancery building of 800 m2 is being built on the same property as the embassy residence. The building will be earthquake-proof and is planned to be the first Swedish Embassy in the world to be certified according to LEED Platinum.

Residence
The ambassadorial residence is located at Paseo de las Palmas 1215 in the Lomas de Chapultepec area. The house was built in 1934 on behalf of a doctor. In 1954, the Swedish state acquired the property through Stig Engelfeldt, who was chargé d'affaires in Mexico City at that time. The house consists of four floors and is built of plastered brick. In the parlour and dining room there are large windows that open onto the garden. On the plot there is also a swimming pool.

Heads of Mission

References

External links
 Embassy of Sweden in Mexico City

Mexico City
Mexico–Sweden relations
Sweden